Network Control Program might refer to:

 Network Control Program (ARPANET) - the software in the hosts which implemented the original protocol suite of the ARPANET, the Network Control Protocol
 IBM Network Control Program